Lydia Neumann is a German currently unattached football striker. She played for eight years for SC 07 Bad Neuenahr in the Bundesliga.

As an under-19 international she played the 2006 U-20 World Championship.

References

1986 births
Living people
German women's footballers
Women's association football forwards